The Adoration of the Magi is a painting by the Italian painter Gentile da Fabriano. The work, housed in the Uffizi Gallery in Florence, Italy, is considered his finest work, and has been described as "the culminating work of International Gothic painting".

The artwork was commissioned by the famous banker Palla Strozzi and incorporates many notable elements. The choice of materials including the vibrant colors, gold leaf, and silver used in the painting creates a brilliant and attractive effect. Techniques such as lighting, depth, and three-dimensionality are prevalent in the work and were novel for the time. The frame, along with the painting, is a work of art in itself, specifically because of the intricate, Gothic, and ornamental architectural designs incorporated into it. Other elements of the altarpiece draw upon European conceptions, beliefs and imagery about the Orient. Exotic animals such as monkeys, horses, camels, and lions signify the patron's wealth and status, as well as creating an exotic setting relating to the biblical scene of the painting. Arabic imitation script is evident in the artwork, elevating the work's significance in regards to its luxury and exoticism. The clothing worn by the three magi display influences from Orient's luxury textiles with elements such as gold and floral designs that distinguish the three magi and their oriental roots.

Artist, patron, and provenance 
The painting was commissioned by the Florentine literate and patron of the arts Palla Strozzi, at the arrival of the artist in the city in 1420. Palla paid 300 florins for the altarpiece, or about six times the annual salary of a skilled labourer. According to Baldwin, both Palla Strozzi and his father, Onofrio, appear in the painting − Palla as the man in the red hat in the forefront of the painting, and Onofrio as the falcon trainer situated behind the youngest king. According to other opinions, the falcon trainer depicts the commissioner Palla Strozzi with his eldest son Lorenzo to his right. Finished in 1423, the painting was placed in the new chapel of the church of Santa Trinita which Lorenzo Ghiberti was executing in these years.

Description, materials, and techniques

The works shows both the international and Sienese schools' influences on Gentile's art, combined with the Renaissance novelties that he knew in Florence. The panel portrays the path of the three Magi in several scenes which start from the upper left corner (the voyage and the entrance into Bethlehem) and continue clockwise, to the larger meeting with the Virgin Mary and the newborn Jesus which occupies the lowest part of the picture. All the figures wear splendid Renaissance costumes, brocades richly decorated with real gold and precious stones inserted in the panel. Above in the background, the magi are shown entering Bethlehem on horses, once they arrive before the Christ-child, they are shown taking off their extravagant crowns to pay respect to the newborn Jesus when they meet him. Gentile's typical attention for detail is also evident in the exotic animals, such as a leopard, a dromedary, some apes and a lion, as well as the magnificent horses and a hound. Gentile created a three-dimensional space where animals protrude in front of one another. Higher up in the background of the painting, human figures are clustered together and not given the same perspective as the animals.

The choice of materials emphasized the importance of certain aspects of the painting. Mary's blue robe was painted using the extremely expensive color ultramarine, while other blue portions of the painting used an other, less expensive blue pigment. The use of ultramarine shows the importance of Mary and its use emphasizes the brilliance of her robe. Gold was another valuable material used, in the technique of pastiglia as well as gold leaf. The pastiglia technique transforms parts like the crowns, textiles, and spurs into three-dimensional objects due to the gold pieces added as relief in parts of the art work. Silver was also an additional material used to add dimension to the artwork as it was raised off the surface of the painting.

The artist utilized artistic techniques throughout the painting, some of which are particularly notable in the predella. Naturalistic lighting in both the foreground and the background of the painting creates a sense of visual continuity within the painting. Depth and depiction of three-dimensional figures bring the artwork to life and help to define space. Gentile also depicted the faces of the figures with varying facial expressions with a high amount of detail, which was not commonly done by earlier artists. The altarpiece was bejeweled in order to emphasize the patron's wealth. Gentile employs lighter brush strokes creating softer fur, leaves, fabrics, and shadows than other painters during his time. The use of pastiglia created a separation between the thin metals that were added into the altarpiece and the paint in order to add a sense of three-dimensionality.

Architectural frame

The frame is also a work of art in itself, characterized by three cusps with tondos portraying Christ Blessing (center) and the Annunciation (with the Archangel Gabriel on the left and the Madonna on the right). The three main arches of the frame help to clearly separate these narratives from the three main scenes below that depict the journey of the Magi. The predella also has three rectangular paintings with scenes of Jesus' childhood: the Nativity, the Flight into Egypt and the Presentation at the Temple (the latter is a copy, since the original was removed from the altarpiece and is in the Louvre in Paris). As the first altarpiece made with panel and frame in two separate pieces, it the first independent frame as we know it today. Gentile's incorporation of this completely self-supporting frame intended to protect the painting instead of being inseparable from the painting helped lead to this modern idea of a frame.

The frame of the Adoration of the Magi is a Gothic design structure with impressive craftsmanship. It reflects the International Gothic style of Florence with its thin, spiral columns and a composition made up of three main geometric, ornamental arches described as "mixtilineal" (but better known as a lambrequin arch). The influence of Lorenzo Ghiberti is linked to the design of the frame due to his use of similar architectural motifs and designs in his sculptures created for the Orsanmichele in Florence. For example, in the Calamala niche for the sculpture of Saint John the Baptist, Ghiberti employed lambrequin arches to frame the central subject. Gentile's altarpiece includes three of these lambrequin arches atop the painting. These arches on the frame of the painting, like the ones in the Calamala niche, are both surrounded with decorative ornamentation. Other elements of the frame's design relate to the Calamala niche including spiral columns that add beauty to the piers on the inner sides of the frame. An architectural detail of the frame that differs from the Calamala niche but relates to the main entrance portals of the Orsanmichele, is the inclusion of a tondo that has been placed beneath each arch, and is therefore seen three times at the top of each lambrequin arch in Gentile's frame. Elements that stand out in the frame's columns is not only the ornamentation and geometric patterns, but also the delicacy and richness. There is even a rare feature of painted flowers on some of the piers further emphasizing Gentile's detailed craftsmanship. The frame is also characterized with polychromy, gold, and silver, all of which offer an astonishing and brilliant effect.

Influences and signs of the Orient

Exotic animals 

Exotic animals are included in the altarpiece because they were a sign of wealth and connection, and also spurred the curiosity of Europeans. Additionally, they hold greater purpose to help the imagery depict an aura of the Orient in order to establish a Middle Eastern setting for the work. Foreign, exotic animals such as camels were given as gifts, monkeys were collected, and lions and leopards were trained for purposes such as hunting. All of these non-European animals can be found in the painting. Other animals that are included in the artwork are: falcons, leopards and dogs. Dogs depicted in the painting can be connected to classical antiquity since dogs were commonly depicted in Greco-Roman arts such as Roman sarcophagi. The inclusion of a falcon was very intentional and significant because it has been linked to Persian and Arabian tradition and culture. Falcons were also used for hunting sport and was seen as a sign of nobility, since kings used falcons as the choice of bird for hunting. Palla Strozzi, the patron, is also painted in the image holding a falcon, and the purpose of this was to not only signify his status but also serves as a visual pun, since the term "falconer" translates to Strozzieri in the Tuscan dialect. Another falcon in the painting is situated just below in the middle of arch and is shown flying and spreading its wings. The falcon likely symbolizes chivalry, and within religious works such as this, can even evoke the Holy Spirit.

Pseudo-Arabic inscriptions 

Arabic writing was admired for its luxuriousness and exotic qualities. Gentile's altarpiece includes pseudo-Arabic inscriptions inscribed on the golden halos of Mary and Joseph that are in turn divided by four rosettes. The details of gold and pseudo-Arabic inscriptions create a sense of holiness, as well as a clear reference to the Orient. Due to growing trade relationships with the East, mainly Mamluk Egypt, different material goods such as ceramics, metalwork, and textiles helped to spread the influence of Arabic inscriptions, leading to an admiration by the Europeans. The use of pseudo-Arabic inscriptions became widespread in Florence influencing Gentile's artwork since his pre-Florentine paintings do not include pseudo-Arabic. Wealthy families such as the Strozzi family were able to obtain these foreign goods that then allowed them to include these objects with qualities of the Orient in works like the Adoration of the Magi. This link is further emphasized by the connection between Egyptian Mamluk metalwork, for example a brass bowl sold at Christie's London in 2015, and the halos of Mary and Joseph which are both separated in four parts and inscribed with pseudo-Arabic inscriptions. The artist also incorporated pseudo-Arabic inscriptions into the work in an effort to act in accordance with what other Italian artists were doing since it was popular and attractive. Many of Gentile da Fabriano's other works include pseudo-Arabic inscriptions, such as in the halo of Mary in the Coronation of the Virgin and the halo and robe of Mary in the Madonna and Child. Moreover, the pseudo-Arabic inscriptions also created a sense of sacredness and linked viewers to the concept and image of the Holy land of Jerusalem. As shown by Fabriano's Adoration of the Magi, Europeans mimicked Arabic writing in their own artistic goods to appeal towards the exotic demand and Orient influences.

Islamic textiles, dress, and fabrics 

The style of dress and fabrics that clothe the individual figures in the Adoration of the Magi, especially the three magi, is incredibly decorative comprising rich patterns with elements of gold and floral designs. Italian textiles during the Renaissance as shown in the altarpiece display a new taste for floral designs, and contain Oriental patterns and elements including ogival and fluctuating stem patterns. The clothing worn included expensive and highly desired materials such as silks, velvet, brocades, and damasks. These sumptuous style of dress draws upon the luxury textiles purchased and spread through the international luxury trade network. The textiles worn by the magi signify the Orient origins of not only the magi, but of the overall biblical scene to evoke the holy land. Islamic textiles also signify status and rank since this kind of clothing was in high demand and expensive. The magi Caspar is shown dressed in a dark tunic contrasted against the a pattern of gold pomegranates that symbolize rebirth in a Christian context and were associated with the Orient. The outfits of the other magi including Melchior and Balthazar, also include gold, silver, and detailed floral designs. Some men are shown wearing turbans that not only bring about the idea of the three kings coming from the Orient, but also creates a more exotic Middle Eastern setting. The types of dress are used to distinguish between the magi and the holy family.

Furthermore, the magi and their followers are wearing extravagant robes that are covered with patterns and designs. By contrast, Mary is depicted wearing a deep blue robe that covers the other parts of her wardrobe. Around her head she wears an intricately detailed black and white shawl with geometric patterns. Jesus is shown clothed in a white tunic that is detailed with gold.

References

Sources

External links

 http://www.slideshare.net/valdesjm/u4-romanesque-2893691?next_slideshow=2
 Laetitiana Educational Video explaining the painting: https://www.youtube.com/watch?v=HccA2Hobzvk

1423 paintings
Paintings in the collection of the Uffizi
Gentile da Fabriano
Paintings by Gentile da Fabriano
Lions in art
Horses in art
Paintings depicting the Annunciation
Paintings depicting the Flight into Egypt
Birds in art
Cattle in art
Altarpieces
Donkeys in art
Sun in art